Knob Fork is a stream in the U.S. state of West Virginia.

Knob Fork heads at a type of summit called a knob, hence the name.

See also
List of rivers of West Virginia

References

Rivers of Wetzel County, West Virginia
Rivers of West Virginia